Bingo may refer to:

Bingo Department, Burkina Faso
Bingo, Boulkiemdé, Burkina Faso – the capital of Bingo Department
Bingo, Boulgou, Burkina Faso